Goruneşti may refer to several villages in Romania:

 Goruneşti, a village in the town of Bălceşti, Vâlcea County
 Goruneşti, a village in Slătioara Commune, Vâlcea County

See also 
 Gorun (disambiguation)
 Goruni (disambiguation)